George Biros is a Greek American engineer, currently the W. A. "Tex" Moncrief Professor in Simulation-Based Engineering Endowed Chair #2 at the University of Texas at Austin.

References

Year of birth missing (living people)
Living people
21st-century American engineers
University of Texas at Austin faculty
Carnegie Mellon University alumni
Georgia Tech faculty
University of Pennsylvania faculty